Alfred Eugene "Sonny" Collins (born January 17, 1953) is a former American football running back who played in the National Football League (NFL). He was drafted by the Atlanta Falcons in the second round of the 1976 NFL draft. He played college football at Kentucky.

College career
Collins rushed for 3,835 yards with 26 touchdowns during his college career and was the 1973 SEC Player of the Year. He finished his collegiate career at Kentucky as the all-time leading rusher. The record would stand for 43 years until Benny Snell surpassed it in 2019.

In 2012, he was named an SEC Football Legend.

NFL career
Collins was drafted by the Atlanta Falcons in the second round (#36 overall) of the 1976 NFL Draft. He only played for a year before retiring with a career ending knee injury.

References

1953 births
Living people
People from Madisonville, Kentucky
Players of American football from Kentucky
American football running backs
Kentucky Wildcats football players
Atlanta Falcons players